The following is a list of public school districts within the State of Utah in the United States. In addition to the schools governed by these districts, the state has approximately 100 charter schools that operate independently of school districts, but still receive public funds. There are also approximately 120 private and parochial schools that operate within state.


Districts
All data is from the 2016-17 school year and is slightly outdated.

Superintendents are up to date as of 3/10/2017

Educator Statistics 2016 (based on FTE licensed classroom teachers PK-12)

See also
 List of high schools in Utah

References

External links

 Utah State Board of Education
 Utah School and Institution Websites - Public School Districts (official Utah State website)

 
School districts in Utah
Utah
School districts in Utah